Stewart Dawson Cruickshank (born 1970), is a male former weightlifter who competed for England. Fitness consultant and personal trainer at Bisham Abbey National Sports Centre, director and founder at Zalva Studio.

Weightlifting career
Cruickshank represented England and won a silver medal and two bronze medals in the 70 kg division, at the 1994 Commonwealth Games in Victoria. Four years later he won a snatch silver medal for England, at the 1998 Commonwealth Games in Kuala Lumpur, Malaysia  and in 2002 he won a bronze medal in the combined at the 2002 Commonwealth Games.

References

Living people
1970 births
English male weightlifters
Commonwealth Games medallists in weightlifting
Commonwealth Games bronze medallists for England
Commonwealth Games silver medallists for England
Weightlifters at the 1994 Commonwealth Games
Weightlifters at the 1998 Commonwealth Games
Weightlifters at the 2002 Commonwealth Games
20th-century English people
21st-century English people
Weightlifting coaches
Medallists at the 1994 Commonwealth Games
Medallists at the 1998 Commonwealth Games
Medallists at the 2002 Commonwealth Games